Mercator Ice Piedmont is a gently-sloping ice piedmont at the head of Mobiloil Inlet, formed by the confluence of the Gibbs, Lammers, Cole and Weyerhaeuser Glaciers in eastern Graham Land, Antarctica. The feature was first photographed from the air by Lincoln Ellsworth in November 1935, and was plotted from these photos by W.L.G. Joerg as the lower end of a "major valley depression" along the coast. It was first seen from the ground by Finn Ronne and Carl R. Eklund of the United States Antarctic Service, 1939–41, which also obtained air photos. The ice piedmont was surveyed by the Falkland Islands Dependencies Survey in December 1958, and was named by the UK Antarctic Place-Names Committee after Flemish mathematician and geographer Gerardus Mercator, the originator, in 1568, of the map projection which bears his name.

Further reading 
 Jane G. Ferrigno, Alison J. Cook, Amy M. Mathie, Richard S. Williams, Jr., Charles Swithinbank, Kevin M. Foley, Adrian J. Fox, Janet W. Thomson, and Jörn Sievers, Coastal-Change and Glaciological Map of the Larsen Ice Shelf Area, Antarctica: 1940–2005, USGS
 Huber, Jacqueline and Cook, Alison J. and Paul, Frank and Zemp, Michael (2017), A complete glacier inventory of the Antarctic Peninsula based on Landsat7 images from 2000 to 2002 and other preexisting data sets, Earth system science data., 9 (1). pp. 115–131. https://doi.org/10.5194/essd-9-115-2017
 Pedro Skvarca, Changes and surface features of the Larsen Ice Shelf, Antarctica, derived from Landsat and Kosmos mosaics, Annals of Glaciology, Volume 20 1994 , pp. 6–12, DOI: https://doi.org/10.3189/1994AoG20-1-6-12

External links 

 Mercator Ice Piedmont on USGS website
 Mercator Ice Piedmont on SCAR website
 Mercator Ice Piedmont on mindat.org

References

Ice piedmonts of Graham Land
Bowman Coast